Lupercus may refer to:
 Lupercus (mythology),  a god in Roman mythology
 Lupercus of Berytus,  a Greek grammarian